Baščaršija Nights (also known as Nights of Baščaršija; Bosnian, Croatian and Serbian: Baščaršijske noći / Башчаршијске ноћи) is the biggest culture festival in Sarajevo, Bosnia and Herzegovina. Taking place throughout July every year, it celebrates various aspects of the nation's culture, and includes performances of classical music, rock and roll and folk music; live theatre; various exhibits and folklore displays; as well as books, film, children's programming, opera and ballet.

Performances usually take place outdoors, in the streets of Sarajevo's Old Town district and its historic Baščaršija neighborhood. Admission is free. It is estimated that about 150,000 people attend the festival's 40–50 events each year.

The first day of the festival always features a performance by the Sarajevo Philharmonic Orchestra, which is attended by numerous city and canton politicians.

A concert by popular Bosnian singer Dino Merlin concluded the festival in 2000. It was held in Stadium Koševo and was sold out. The first Bosnian opera in history was part of the festival in 2003, as well as a performance by local rockers Zabranjeno pušenje.

References

External links
 

Folk festivals in Bosnia and Herzegovina
Summer events in Bosnia and Herzegovina
Festivals in Sarajevo
Annual events in Bosnia and Herzegovina
Baščaršija